Safiabad Agricultural and Horticultural Centre ( – Marḵaz Keshāvarzī va Dāmparūrī Safīābād) is a village and agricultural centre in Shamsabad Rural District, in the Central District of Dezful County, Khuzestan Province, Iran. At the 2006 census, its population was 40.

References 

Populated places in Dezful County